Omair Rana (born January 31, 1978) is a Pakistani actor and theatre director. He  also directs plays in educational institutes, notably One Flew Over The Cuckoo's Nest (2014) and Life of Galileo (2013) at Lahore Grammar School Johar Town campus. He runs his theatre company by the name of Real Entertainment Productions (REP) that was founded in 2000 and has done over 50 plays ever since.

Early life and career
He had his early education in Al Ain, UAE, Al Ain English-speaking school, which was instrumental in inculcating his love for theatre. In the course of his career development, he also undertook a number of internships including one with the Lahore Chamber of Commerce & Industry.

He is a theater actor in the region who has made a significant contribution in the field of teaching Dramatics Art at a number of institutions, including introducing IGCSE Drama to Pakistan in 2009. As a screen actor he has also worked in numerous TV productions and in the films Chambaili and Tamanna.

Making his TV debut in 2014, he won a lot of recognition for his performances in dramas like Maan, Sang-e-Mar Mar and O Rangreza, and in 2018 he starred in the much anticipated Hum TV's period drama Aangan. Omair Rana was appointed as a CLF Goodwill Ambassador by the Children's Literature Festival on July 30, 2019.

Filmography

Films

Television

Webseries

Controversies 
In June 2020, many female students of Lahore Grammar School came forward with allegations of sexual harassment and assault by many of the school's male faculty members. Omair Rana was implicated in the scandal even though no formal complaints of harassment were made against him. The allegations were based on a few tweets. No proof has been presented against Omair Rana and no witnesses have come forward to corroborate the allegations.

References

External links
 
 
 

1978 births
Living people
Pakistani male film actors
Male actors from Lahore
Punjabi people
Pakistani theatre directors
Alumni of the London School of Economics